Hidden Treasures Dabur Vatika Shampoo Miss Nepal 2023, the 27th Miss Nepal beauty pageant will be held on 27 May 2023 at the Godavari Sunrise Convention Center, at Godawari, Lalitpur. Miss Nepal World 2022 Priyanka Rani Joshi will crown her successor as Miss Nepal World 2023, Miss Nepal Earth 2022 Sareesha Shrestha will crown Miss Nepal Earth 2023 and Nancy Khadka will crown Miss Nepal International 2023respectively. The grand coronation event will be shown live Exclusively on Kantipur Television HD, Kantipur Cineplex HD and Official YouTube Channel.

Regional Auditions
To ensure that the pageant is inclusive and representative of all regions, the audition will cover all seven Provinces of Nepal. Regional auditions will be held in Province No. 1, Madhesh Province, Bagmati Province, Gandaki Province, Lumbini Province, Karnali Province, and Sudurpashchim Province. The final audition in Kathmandu will be held on 18 March at the Park Village Hotel in Budhanilkantha, Nepal. The selected Top 24 finalists will compete at the grand coronation event of Miss Nepal 2023 on 27 May 2023.

Results

Placements
Color key

The Big 3 main titles were awarded in the following order:

Special awards

References

External links

Beauty pageants in Nepal
2023 beauty pageants
2023 in Nepal
Miss Nepal